The 2018 season was Vålerenga's 17th consecutive year in the top flight now known as Eliteserien. They finished sixth in the Eliteserien and reached the Quarterfinal's of the Cup where they were knocked out by Rosenborg.

Squad

Out on loan

Transfers

In

Out

Loans in

Loans out

Released

Competitions

Eliteserien

Results summary

Results by round

Results

Table

Norwegian Cup

Squad statistics

Appearances and goals

|-
|colspan="14"|Players away from Vålerenga on loan:
|-
|colspan="14"|Players who left Vålerenga during the season:

|}

Goal scorers

Disciplinary record

References

External links
 Official pages
 Vålerenga Fotball På Nett – the biggest site for unofficial news and views
 Klanen, official Vålerenga supporters club
 Jarles VIF Stats

Vålerenga Fotball seasons
Valerenga